Sophora fernandeziana is a species of flowering plant in the family Fabaceae, that is endemic to the Juan Fernández Islands of Chile.  It is threatened by habitat loss.

References

fernandeziana
Endemic flora of the Juan Fernández Islands
Vulnerable plants
Taxonomy articles created by Polbot